Juan Manuel Valero Martínez (born 3 January 1978), known as Juanma, is a Spanish retired footballer who played as a right back.

He spent the vast majority of his 18-year senior career with Murcia.

Football career
Born in Alicante, Valencian Community, Juanma made his professional debuts with Real Murcia, first playing with the reserves and moving to the first team aged 18. He helped the latter return to the second division in 2000, then retained his first-choice status in the subsequent seasons; in 2002–03 he appeared in 34 matches as Murcia returned to La Liga after a 14-year absence, only to be immediately relegated back.

In summer 2007, after another top division promotion, longtime club captain Juanma was deemed surplus to requirements by new coach Javier Clemente, and served a loan with Hércules CF. After that he spent some months training separately and, after arranging for a release with the board of directors, joined Orihuela CF in the third level in January 2009.

Juanma retired in June 2011 at the age of 33, after a further two full campaigns with Orihuela always in division three.

References

External links

1978 births
Living people
Footballers from Alicante
Spanish footballers
Association football defenders
La Liga players
Segunda División players
Segunda División B players
Tercera División players
Real Murcia Imperial players
Real Murcia players
Hércules CF players
Orihuela CF players